The 12th Annual Panasonic Awards honoring the favorite in Indonesian television programming/production works/individual, were held on Friday, March 27, 2009 at the XXI Jakarta Theater in Jalan M.H. Thamrin, Menteng, Central Jakarta. Comedian Olga Syahputra and actor Raffi Ahmad hosted for this awards ceremonies. Chairman of the committee on this edition was Rinaldi Sjarif. The night of 12th ceremonies awards was held by Indonesian vice-president Jusuf Kalla and broadcast live on RCTI, MNCTV and Global TV.

Scoring system
Selection of award categories is based on research conducted by AGB Nielsen Media Research. Each nomination is verified by the verification team composed of practitioners and people who are experts in the field of television and entertainment. Initial screening program of 12th annual ceremonies were did by AGB Media Research. Methods poll conducted by telephone on 1300 respondents were spread across ten cities in Indonesia.

The verification team of 12th annual ceremonies consists of individual who expert on television program, are Wishnutama (Trans TV), Yeni P. Ashar and Rosiana Silalahi (SCTV, Nana Putra (TPI), Manoj Punjabi (MD Entertainment), Irfan Ramli (Association of Indonesian advertising), Idi Subandi (Students of the Graduate Faculty of Communication UI and cultural observer) and Anjasmara (actor).

Winners and nominees 
The nominees were announced on February 17, 2009. Winners are listed first and highlighted on boldface.

Individual

References

External links 
 Pemenang Panasonic Award 2009. KapanLagi.com, 28 March 2009. Diakses pada 22 Mei 2011.
 Inilah Daftar Pemenang Panasonic Awards 2009

2009
2009 television awards